General Lyons may refer to:

David B. Lyons (fl. 1990s–2020s), U.S. Air Force major general
Henry Lyons, 1st Baron Ennisdale (1877–1963), British Army major general
Humphrey Lyons (1802–1873), British Indian Army lieutenant general
Judd H. Lyons ((born 1962), U.S. Army National Guard major general
Stephen R. Lyons (fl. 1990s–2020s), U.S. Army four-star general
Thomas Lyons (British Army officer) (1829–1897), British Army general

See also
General Lyon (disambiguation)